Radivoje Janković (7 October 1889 – 1949) was a Yugoslav general of the Royal Army. He had the rank of Division General.

17 April 1936 – 22 October 1937: Deputy Chief of Operations, General Staff 
6 September 1936: Promoted to Brigadni General 
22 October 1937 – 29 January 1940: Chief of Directorate I, General Staff 
29 January 1940 – 23 October 1940: Chief of Directorate III, General Staff 
1 December 1940: Promoted to Divizijski General 
23 October 1940 – 3 April 1941: Commander, Moravska Division District 
3 April 1941 – 17 April 1941: Chief of Army Operations 
after 1941: Adjutant general of the King Peter II of Yugoslavia, whom he accompanied into exile.

Sources
Generali i admirali Kraljevine Jugoslavije 1918–1941, by Mile S. Bjelajac, Andris J. Kursietis, personal archives

Royal Yugoslav Army personnel
Royal Yugoslav Army personnel of World War II
1949 deaths
1889 births
Serbian exiles
20th-century Serbian people
Serbian generals